Dawn of the Mummy is a 1981 Italian-American horror film directed by Frank Agrama, who also served as writer and producer on the film. While not prosecuted for obscenity, the film was seized and confiscated in the UK under Section 3 of the Obscene Publications Act 1959 during the video nasty panic.

Plot
In ancient Egypt during the fourth millennium BC, slave raiders abduct several villagers to be servants for the burial of Pharaoh Sefirama. They are ordered to stand around the Pharaoh's sarcophagus, killed with poison gas, and the entrance to his tomb is sealed. The high priestess who attended the burial proclaims that "he who enters this tomb, after it is sealed, will die on the dawn of the mummy."

Thousands of years later, in the present day, three men, Rick, Tariq, and Karib, detonate the tomb and uncover its entrance. Rick warns the other two to wait until the next morning, as the air around the uncovered tomb is poisoned. The high priestess, now an elderly woman, screams and tells them that the tomb is cursed but is scared off when Rick shoots his pistol at the air. Rick tells them to guard the tomb for the night and drives away in his Jeep.

That evening, three local grave robbers arrive riding on camels and are greeted by the old woman, who tells them to close the tomb to prevent its curse. They ask her and enter the tomb but get infected by its poisonous gases. One of them dies, while the other two escape.

A photographer and a group of American models travel to Egypt for a fashion shoot. On the way to the tomb, one of their tires gets punctured, and the group has to stop to replace it. One of the models, Lisa, asks the director, Gary, to look at the other side of a dune. They race to the bottom of the other side, but Lisa falls and gets scared by one of the grave robbers' severed heads lying on the sand. The rest of their group takes them back to their location.

Rick and his group return to the tomb and explore its burial chamber, though Rick's henchmen are disappointed that there is no gold. Ahamed Zaiki, a local businessman, arrives to check on his investments in the excavations, and after Rick's assurances, he leaves. The next morning, Rick attempts to chisel a passage into the chamber, but Tarak and Karib detonate its entrance with more dynamite. Even though they were disappointed again by the chamber's lack of gold, they open Sefirama's sarcophagus to look for more treasures. A mouse jumps onto Karib's back and frightens him.

After settling near a riverbank village for the night, the American models' group moves on the next morning to shoot photos near the tomb. Karib shoots his gun at them, thinking they are intruders, but Rick and Tarak stop him. The models' group proceeds to the tomb against Rick and his henchmen's objections. While doing so, their hot lights accidentally revive Pharaoh Seferman's mummy. Rick snaps off the cable on one of their spotlights. One of the models, named Jenny, is asked to go and find a battery for their spotlights, but she spills a bowl containing one of the Pharaoh's organs, infecting her hand and frightening her. Their hot lights accidentally revive Pharaoh Seferman's mummy and his followers, a band of flesh-eating zombies.

Tariq is left to return to his home in a city, while Jenny's hand infection persists and burns her. Karib enters the tomb alone by himself, cuts open Pharaoh Sefirama's mummy, and steals his crook and flail. A door to another chamber opens. Karib enters but is incapacitated by the door and dragged away.

The following day, Rick and Tariq enter the tomb as they search for Karib and are thrilled to find Pharaoh Sefirama's crook, flail, and other treasures. The models and their team return for another photoshoot, but their continued usage of lighting has awakened the Pharaoh.

At a campfire that night, the group of models sing along. The team finds the bodies of the two Bedouin grave robbers whose heads are crushed. Rick arrives and tells the team they should leave. The photographer, named Bill, says he needs one more day to shoot, and then they will leave. Meanwhile, the old woman/high priestess goes into the tomb and finds the mummy gone. The mummy appears and kills the old woman. At dawn, Seferaman's army rises out of the sand.

The next day, Bill is still taking pictures of the site and says they need 48 hours more to shoot. One of the models gets lost in the tomb. Meanwhile, Gary and Ahmed go to town for a rest. Another local named Omar gives Jenny and Gary a "smoke." Jenny sees the mummy, gets hysterical, and runs to Gary, but the mummy is gone when he looks.

The mummy chops the head off one of the tomb raiders at the tomb. Two models, Lisa and Melinda, take a swim at the nearby oasis. Melinda gets out of the water and takes a walk, where she runs into the mummy and one of his "soldiers," where they kill Melinda by biting and tearing out her throat.

The next day, Rick finds Tariq dead and drives away. Rick goes to the tomb and calls for the God of the Sun. A wall slides back, and Rick finds the treasure. He screams in delight, but the mummy returns and kills Rick.

Bill and Gary go to town to see Omar, where he is celebrating his wedding. Gary gives Omar his western cowboy hat, and Omar gives Gary his golden head covering.

Back at the camp, Lisa looks around the tomb. Bill finds the gold in the tomb and calls out. Suddenly, Rick's severed head falls from the ceiling and lands in Bill's arms. He flees back to the camp running from the mummy's "soldiers." Bill shoots the mummy with a gun, but to no effect. The mummy strangles and tears off Bill's head, and the models run and scream. Jenny gets torn apart and eaten alive by the mummy's "soldiers" while the two remaining models flee in a jeep.

Back at the wedding celebration in town, there is dancing in the streets, and the mummy's "soldiers" are seen eating Omar's bride in a tent. At this point, climactic carnage ensues as everyone runs, and the mummy soldiers grab and bite and kill many people in the street. The mummy is standing in the street looking at the carnage. The two surviving models, Lisa and June, arrive and throw sticks of dynamite at the mummy with little effect. With a bit of help from Omar, models go into a shack, spread gasoline, light a fuse in a box of dynamite and blow up the shed with the mummy in it. Lisa, June, and Omar celebrate when Gary arrives, and they all walk away. But in the final shot, the mummy's hand rises from the rubble.

Cast
 Brenda King as Lisa
 Barry Sattels as Bill
 George Peck as Rick
 John Salvo as Gary
 Ibrahim Khan as Karib
 Joan Levy as Jenny
 Ellen Faison as Melinda
 Dianne Beatty as Joan
 Ali Gohar as Tariq
 Ahmed Rateb as Omar
 Bahar Saied
 Ali Azab
 Ahamed Labab as Ahamed
 Laila Nasr as High Priestess/Old Hag
 Kandarp Raval as The servant boy (Mummy)

Production

Dawn of the Mummy was filmed in Egypt with a mostly Italian crew leading many to mistake it as an Italian film.

Unlike traditional interpretations of mummies in cinema, the film's portrayal of the undead is quite unique. In the film, the mummies are portrayed as ravenous flesh-eaters, similar to the popular portrayal of zombies in which both share many similarities.

Due to the film's surprisingly graphic content, the film was originally subject to several cuts in the UK in order to trim down the film's more graphic scenes; approximately 1 minute and 43 seconds were cut from 12 different scenes in the film. Some scenes included The Mummy ramming a machete into the character Tarak's head, a man being gutted by the mummy, and scenes where the mummy's undead servants feast on several characters. The cuts were waived for the 2003 Anchor Bay DVD.

Release

Home media 

Dawn of the Mummy has been released in VHS and DVD format.  The film was released in region 1 by Madacy Entertainment, as a VHS transfer.  The packaging is said to list the film's Theatrical Trailer and other Theatrical Trailers, although there is only one on the disc, it is not for the main feature, it is of a 1997 film, Road Ends.  It does however feature an audio commentary track by director Frank Agrama.

The film was released uncut in the UK by Anchor Bay Entertainment.  It features an anamorphic widescreen 1.77:1 transfer, plus the 4:3 full-screen transfer, DTS Digital Surround, Dolby Digital 2.0 & 5.1 Surround. The extras include Director's Audio Commentary, Stills Gallery, Production Notes, and Trailer.

Reception

The film has received mixed to negative reviews from critics.

John Stanley awarded the film 2 / 4 stars stating, "Hashish smokers in a Cairo square are as exciting as it gets in this tale".
Popcorn Pictures.com gave the film 6/10 stating, "It is an arduous struggle to get past the first half of Dawn of the Mummy but stick with it and you’ll be rewarded with one of the more entertaining zombie flicks of its period: a guilty pleasure of trashy exploitation at its finest. If the entire film had been as enjoyable as the last half, you’d be looking at a bonafide classic right here".

It was awarded a score of 0 / 4 by VideoHound's Golden Movie Retriever which panned the film's plot and acting.

Remake
Anthony Hickox wrote 2012 the script of the remake Prisoners of the Sun, which directed by Roger Christian and stars Joss Ackland, Carmen Chaplin, Nick Moran and John Rhys-Davies. The film was released in April 2015 in the United Kingdom on DVD and Blu-ray.

References

External links

 
 
 

1981 films
1981 horror films
American splatter films
Italian splatter films
Films set in Egypt
English-language Italian films
Italian supernatural horror films
Mummy films
American zombie films
American supernatural horror films
Films shot in Egypt
Films scored by Shuki Levy
1980s English-language films
1980s American films
1980s Italian films